Arne Ole van Erpekum Sem (May 19, 1873 – 1951) was a Norwegian singer, vocal teacher and music critic. He made his debut as Max in Der Freischütz, by Carl Maria von Weber.

Biography

Early years
Erpekum Sem was born in Oslo, but grew up in county Vest-Agder, southern Norway.

References
Yngvar Lillesund,'Sorenskriversonnen fra Mandal som ble verdenskjent kunstner,' Lindesnes Frisinnet Folkeblad for Vest-Agder (May 19, 1973): 1 and 4.

1873 births
1951 deaths
Norwegian male singers
Musicians from Oslo
Norwegian music critics